Science and technology in Wallonia, the southern region of Belgium (Europe), is well developed with the presence of several universities and research institutes.

Universities in Wallonia
Universities in Wallonia are part of the universities of the French Community.
 Université de Namur (UNamur), Namur
 Université catholique de Louvain (UCLouvain), Louvain-la-Neuve
 Université de Liège (ULiège), Liège
 Université de Mons (UMons), Mons

According to the Academic Ranking of World Universities, the University of Louvain (UCLouvain) is among the top 200 universities worldwide.

According to the Webometrics Ranking of World Universities, the University of Liège is among the top 200 universities in Europe and top 400 universities worldwide.

Technology institutes
Wallonia is home to several science and technology organizations.

 ARESA - clinical research cluster
 Automotive Cluster of Wallonia
 Ceramic products cluster
 Eco-building cluster
 Fonds National de la Recherche Scientifique (FNRS)
 Francqui Foundation
 ICT cluster
 Nutrition cluster
 Solid Wastes cluster
 Transport & Logistics Cluster
 Walloon Aeronautical Cluster (EWA)
 Walloon Space Cluster

Science Parks
Several science parks associated with the universities are spread over Wallonia.

 Science Parks of Wallonia
 Louvain-la-Neuve Science Park
 Liège Science Park
 Crealys Science Park
 Aéropole Science Park
 Initialis Science Park
 Qualitis Science Park

See also
 Science and technology in Belgium
 Science and technology in the Brussels-Capital Region
 Science and technology in Flanders
 Belgian Federal Science Policy Office (BELSPO)
 Economy of Belgium
 Sillon industriel
 Agoria

References

External links
Presentation of R&D policies in Belgium (European Commission website, ERAWATCH) 
Presentation of innovation policies in Belgium (European Commission website, ProInno TrendChart for Innovation)

Wallonia
Science and technology in Belgium
Economy of Belgium